Chopa may refer to:
 Damian Paul Chopa (born 1986), a Tanzanian long-distance runner
 Chopa or Chopa de Cortés, the Spanish names for Kyphosus elegans, the Cortez sea chub

CHOPA may refer to:
 Chorus Paulinus, a choir in the Philippines